Harold Thomas Wright (born November 29, 1952) is an American television and theatre actor.

Early life
Wright was born on November 29, 1952, in Englewood, New Jersey.

Career

Wright has appeared in over 40 stage productions on and off Broadway. He began his acting career as an original member of The People's Light and Theater Company outside of Philadelphia. Wright also spent four years at the National Playwrights Conference and two summers at the Sundance Institute.

On Broadway, he performed in A Taste of Honey which received two Tony Award nominations. Some of the notable theaters in which he has appeared include the American Place Theater, Manhattan Theater Club, New York Theatre Workshop, Actors Theater of Louisville, Center Stage, Yale Repertory Theater, The John F. Kennedy Center for the Performing Arts, Hartford Stage, Los Angeles Stage and Film, and Theatre De La Jeune Lune in Minneapolis starring in Farthest From The Sun with Steve Guttenberg. In 1987, he played a hitchhiker in the horror film Creepshow 2.

Wright co-starred in the feature films Barbershop and Barbershop 2: Back in Business with Ice Cube. He also co-starred with Angela Bassett as her ex-lover in Sunshine State, his fifth film with writer/director John Sayles. The other four Sayles films include: Passion Fish, City of Hope, Matewan and The Brother from Another Planet. Since then he co-starred in another Sayles feature, Honeydripper. In 2000, Wright won the Best Actor Award at the Santa Monica Film Festival for his portrayal of John Shed in the indie film Dumbarton Bridge.

He has played roles on several television programs but is best known for playing Mr. Morgan, Yankees co-worker of character George Costanza (Jason Alexander) on Seinfeld; and the hybrid alien Tuvix in the Star Trek: Voyager episode "Tuvix".

Filmography

Film

 Deadbeat (1977) as Old Man
 Red Italy (1979) as Unknown 
 Underground U.S.A. (1980) as Frank
 Subway Riders (1981) as On The Waterfront
 I Ought to Be in Pictures (1982) as Baseball Fan #6
 The Soldier (1982) as Businessman
 Alphabet City (1984) as Chauffeur
 The Brother from Another Planet (1984) as Sam
 Exterminator 2 (1984) as Youth
 Mugsy's Girls (1984) as Party Heckler
 Streetwalkin' (1985) as Henchman #1
 Creepshow 2 (1987) as The Hitchhiker (segment "The Hitchhiker")
 Matewan (1987) as Tom
 I'm Gonna Git You Sucka (1988) as Brothel Man
 Troop Beverly Hills (1989) as James Shakar
 Heart of Dixie (1989) as Black Man At Concert
 Vietnam War Story: The Last Days (1989) as Captain Berry (segment "The Last Outpost")
 Reversal of Fortune (1990) as Jack
 Marked for Death (1990) as Detective Charles Marks
 Street Hunter (1990) as Riley
 City of Hope (1991) as Malik
 Past Midnight (1991) as Lee Samuels
 Dead in the Water (1991) as Hotel Clerk
 Passion Fish (1992) as Luther
 Acting on Impulse (1993) as Dave Byers
 Weekend at Bernie's II (1993) as Charles
 Men of War (1994) as Jamaal
 Forget Paris (1995) as Tommy
 Tales from the Hood (1995) as Martin Moorehouse
 Excessive Force II: Force on Force (1995) as Grant Thompson
 White Man's Burden (1995) as Lionel
 Invasion of Privacy (1996) as Devereux - Theresa's Attorney
 My Fellow Americans (1996) as Secret Service Agent Jim
 Playing Dangerous 2 (1996) as Alton Broom
 Gridlock'd (1997) as Koolaid
 Menno's Mind (1997) as Jor Norwell, Execuited Rebel (uncredited)
 Murder at 1600 (1997) as Secret Service Agent Cooper
 Palmetto (1998) as John Renick
 The Pentagon Wars (1998, TV Movie) as Major William Sayers
 Funny Valentines (1999) as Dr. Thomas Holder
 Dumbarton Bridge (1999) as John Shed
 Chain of Command (2000) as Secret Service Agent Burke
 The Prime Gig (2000) as Marvin Sanders
 Pursuit of Happiness (2001) as Thom
 Alex in Wonder (2001) as Sebastian
 Layover (2001) as Detective Mills
 The Keyman (2001) as 'Popeye'
 Contagion (2002) as Tom Brenner
 P.S. Your Cat Is Dead (2002) as Fred Gable
 Sunshine State (2002) as 'Flash' Phillips
 Barbershop (2002) as Detective Williams
 Lady Jayne: Killer (2003) as Detective Stan
 Hangman's Curse (2003) as Dan Carillo
 White Rush (2003) as Detective Brandt
 Barbershop 2: Back in Business (2004) as Detective Williams
 In Your Eyes (2004) as Phil
 The Gunman (2004) as Captain Carlton
 Dynamite (2004) as Stan
 Chasing Ghosts (2005) as Tom Shields
 American Fusion (2005) as Dr. Lee / Lethal Killah
 A Year and a Day (2005) as Pryor
 Rampage: The Hillside Strangler Murders (2006) as Detective Bryant
 The Darwin Awards (2006) as Detective #2
 World Trade Center (2006) as Officer Reynolds
 Striking Range (2006) as John Hatem
 Sinner (2007) as Officer Thomas
 Live! (2007) as Dr. Raymond Boyd
 Honeydripper (2007) as 'Cool Breeze'
 The Onion Movie (2008) as Kwame Roberts
 B.O.H.I.C.A. (2008) as Horowitz
 The Imposter (2008) as 'Popeye'
 The Cursed (2010) as Willie Gar
 Burning Palms (2010) as Maxwell Barron
 BoyBand (2010) as Pete
 Rift (2011) as Lietenant Neal
 A Beautiful Soul (2012) as Brother Anthony Clark
 Starting from Scratch (2013) as Stan 'Homeless Stan'
 Stanley DeBrock (2013) as Atticus
 Things Never Said (2013) as Daniel
 Beyond the Lights (2014) as Reverend Brown
 Sin Verite (2014) as Francis Vigneri
 Stockholm, Pennsylvania (2015) as Detective Timms
 The Diabolical (2015) as Curtis
 Runaway Island (2015) as Raymond Tepper
 Storage Locker 181 (2016) as Harris
 Rebirth (2016) as The Expert
 South32 (2016) as Sergeant Kake
 Message from the King (2016) as Waylon
 The Secrets of Emily Blair (2016) as Detective Gorodetsky
 Within (2016) as Detective Pascal
 Transformers: The Last Knight (2017) as Military Attache #1
 The Neighborhood (2017) as Jim 'Bourbon' Beam
 Higher Power (2018) as Tom David, Talk Show Host
 Spell (2018) as Edmund
 The Divorce Party (2019) as Sacks
 #Truth (2019) as Donald Cooper
 That's Amor (2022) as Henry

TV appearances

References

External links

1952 births
African-American male actors
American male film actors
American male stage actors
American male television actors
Living people
Male actors from New Jersey
People from Englewood, New Jersey
West Chester University alumni
20th-century American male actors
21st-century American male actors
20th-century African-American people
21st-century African-American people